Pär Sundström (born 8 June 1981) is a Swedish bass player. He and Joakim Brodén are the last remaining founding members of heavy metal band Sabaton. He is also the band's manager and one of the band's lyricists.

Life 
Sundström was born in Falun, Dalarna County, Sweden. During his youth, Sundström played mainly in black and death metal bands. In 1999, he founded Sabaton with Joakim Brodén. Shortly after  Oskar Montelius  the band. Concerning his role in Sabaton he stated in an interview with metalheadspotted.com: "I do a lot of stuff that is necessary for the band as manager."

Before Sabaton became a professional band, Sundström worked for two years "as a manager of a big company". His management office as well as the band's studio are based in Falun.

Sundström has one sister. His main musical influences are Twisted Sister, especially Dee Snider, as well as Skid Row. He speaks of Iron Maiden, Scorpions, Guns N' Roses, Raubtier, Skid Row and Sabaton as his favourite bands.
In the early years of Sabaton, Sundström set up the pyrotechnics for the Sabaton live shows by himself, as he is a trained pyrotechnician.

Discography
Sabaton
Primo Victoria (2005)
Attero Dominatus (2006)
Metalizer (2007)
The Art of War (2008)
Coat of Arms (2010)
Carolus Rex (2012)
Heroes (2014)
 The Last Stand (2016)
 The Great War (2019)
  The War to End All Wars (2022)

References

External links 

Swedish rock musicians
Bass guitarists
People from Falun
1981 births
Living people